The 2011 UK Open Qualifier 8 was the last of eight 2011 UK Open Darts Qualifiers which was held at the Robin Park Tennis Centre in Wigan on Sunday 1 May.

Prize money

Draw

References

8